As-Sa'iqa officially known as Vanguard for the Popular Liberation War - Lightning Forces, is a Palestinian Ba'athist political and military faction created and controlled by Syria. It is linked to the Palestinian branch of the Syrian-led Ba'ath Party, and is a member of the broader Palestine Liberation Organization (PLO), although it is no longer active in the organization. Its Secretary-General is Dr Mohammed Qeis.

History

Early years 
As-Sa'iqa was formed in September 1966 by the Syrian Ba'ath Party. It became active in December 1968, as a member of the Palestine Liberation Organization (PLO). Syria tried to build up an alternative to Yasser Arafat, who was then emerging with his Fatah faction as the primary Palestinian fedayeen leader and politician. As-Sa'iqa was initially the second-largest group within the PLO, after Fatah.

Al-Assad takeover and Purge of As-Sa'iqa 
As-Sa'iqa was also used in the Ba'thist power struggle then in play in Syria, by Salah Jadid to counter the ambitions of Defence Minister Hafez al-Assad. When al-Assad seized power in the November 1970 "Corrective Revolution", as-Sa'iqa was purged and its leaders replaced with al-Assad loyalists (although Jadid loyalists held on to the as-Sai'qa branch active in the Palestinian refugee camps in Jordan until mid-1971, when they were arrested). As new Secretary-General (after Mahmud al-Ma'ayta, who had succeeded Yusuf Zuayyin), al-Assad chose Zuheir Mohsen, a Palestinian Ba'thist who had come to Syria as a refugee from Jordan. He was repeatedly promoted by Syria as a candidate for the post as Chairman of the PLO, to replace Arafat, but never gained support from other factions.

With and against the PLO in Lebanon 
As-Sa'iqa was, and is, used by Syria as a proxy force in the Palestinian movement. While this has prevented as-Sa'iqa from gaining widespread popularity among Palestinians, it became an important force in the Palestinian camps in Syria, as well as in Lebanon. During the Lebanese Civil War, Syria built the movement into one of the most important Palestinian fighting units, but also forced it to join in Syrian offensives against the PLO when relations between al-Assad and Arafat soured. This led to as-Sa'iqa's expulsion from the PLO in 1976, but it was readmitted in December the same year, after the situation had cooled down, and after Syria named this as a condition for further support for the PLO. The attacks on the PLO led to large-scale defections of Syrian-based Palestinians from the movement. As-Saiqa was also responsible for the Damour massacre in 1976 and many other barbaric mass murders.

After Muhsin's assassination in 1979, Isam al-Qadi became the new Secretary-General. The movement remained active during the Lebanese Civil War, and again joined Syria, the Lebanese Shi'a Amal Movement and Abu Musa's Fatah al-Intifada in attacks on the PLO during the War of the Camps in 1984-85, and for the remainder of the Civil War (which lasted until 1990). This again led to mass-defections of Palestinians from the movement (Harris quotes the Syrian-aligned Amal Movement as complaining that the Syrian-backed Palestinian forces sent to attack the PLO were "Abu Musa in the Biqa'" but "become Abu nothing in the Shuf and Abu Ammar on arrival in Beirut"), and reportedly its ranks were filled with non-Palestinian Syrian army recruits. After the end of the Civil War, the movement was nearly out of contact with the PLO mainstream, and exerted influence only in Syria and in Syrian-occupied parts of Lebanon. It kept lobbying within the PLO against the various peace proposals advanced by Arafat, and was part of the Syrian-based National Alliance that opposed Arafat.

As-Sai'qa today 
After the end of the Lebanese Civil War and the 1993 signing of the Oslo Peace Agreement, as-Sai'qa has largely lost its usefulness to the Syrian government, and the state and size of the organization deteriorated. Today, it is wholly insignificant outside Syria, although it retains a presence in Lebanon (its future is uncertain after the end in 2005 of the Syrian Army's presence in Lebanon). It is extremely weak in the West Bank and Gaza Strip, non-existent in the Golan Heights, East Jerusalem and Israel within the Green Line, and has not been active during the al-Aqsa Intifada. Its importance to Syria has lessened, both because the PLO has diminished in importance compared to the Palestinian National Authority. As-Sai'qa boycotts PNA bodies, and its representative on the PLO Executive Committee also boycotts its sessions.

Following the outbreak of the Syrian Civil War in 2011, as-Sa'iqa took up arms in support of the Syrian Ba'athist government, participating in numerous military operations such as the Southern Damascus offensive (April–May 2018), and the 2018 Southern Syria offensive. Having greatly diminished in numbers, the organization's forces had suffered just 30 fighters killed in action by April 2018. By August 2018, As-Sa'iqa began to lay off a substantial number of its fighters, mostly because they were no longer needed and because of lack of funds.

Organization and structure 
Since 2007, Farhan Abu Hayja has been Secretary-General of as-Sa'iqa. Muhammad al-Khalifa is its representative on the PLO Executive Committee, but boycotts sessions of the PLO EC. During much of the 1970s, as-Sai'qa's representatives in the PLO EC (Muhsin and al-Qadi) held the prestigious and sensitive post of Head of the Military Department, which reflected the military importance of the movement in those years.

Syrian backing in the 1970s gave as-Sa'iqa a military weight far greater than its political influence, which has always been small. During the Lebanese Civil War, it was often the second largest Palestinian faction in fighting strength, after Yassir Arafat's Fatah movement.

Under the name Eagles of the Palestinian Revolution - possibly the name of the armed wing of as-Sa'iqa - the organization committed a number of international terrorist attacks. Among these was the 1979 takeover of the Egyptian embassy in Ankara, Turkey (although attributed to Fatah) and a kidnapping of Jews emigrating by train through Austria from the Soviet Union to Israel. Since the early 1990s, the organization has not committed any known attacks, and it is not listed on the U.S. State Department list of Foreign Terrorist Organizations.

Ideological profile 
As-Sa'iqa's political agenda is identical to that of Ba'athist Syria, i.e., Arab socialist, nationalist and strongly committed to Pan-Arab doctrine. While this reflects its Ba'thist programme, it has also used Pan-Arabism as a means of supporting the primacy of its sponsor, Syria, over the Arafat-led PLO's claim to exclusive representation of the Palestinian people. Thus, it rejected "Palestinization" of the conflict with Israel, insisting on the necessary involvement of the greater Arab nation. This occasionally went to extremes, with as-Sa'iqa leaders denying the existence of a separate Palestinian people within the wider Arab nation.

The group has generally taken a hard line stance (reflecting that of Syria) on issues such as the recognition of Israel, the Oslo Accords, and other questions of Palestinian goals and political orientation. It was a member of the 1974 Rejectionist Front, despite supporting the Ten Point Programme that initially caused the PLO/Rejectionist Front split.

See also 
Damour massacre
Aishiyeh massacre
Arab–Israeli conflict
Arab Liberation Front
Popular Front for the Liberation of Palestine – General Command
Fatah al-Intifada
Palestine Liberation Army

Notes

References 
Pity the Nation: Lebanon at War Fisk, Robert (2001)
Faces of Lebanon: Sects, Wars, and Global Extensions (Princeton Series on the Middle East)Harris William W (1997)

External links 
Attacks attributed to Saiqa on START database
Attacks attributed to the "Eagles of the Palestinian Revolution" on START

Arab nationalism in the Palestinian territories
Arab nationalist militant groups
Ba'athist parties
Palestine
Factions of the Palestine Liberation Organization
Foreign relations of Syria
Palestinian militant groups
Palestinian nationalist parties
Political parties established in 1966
Socialist parties in the Palestinian territories
Pro-government factions of the Syrian civil war
Axis of Resistance